Mayland may refer to:

Mayland Heights, Calgary, Canada
Mayland, Essex, England
Mayland, Tennessee, United States

See also
Maylandia, a genus of fish
Maylands (disambiguation)